Karen Renee Gibson Fleming is a Professor of Biophysics at Johns Hopkins University. She investigates the energetics of transmembrane helix-helix interactions. Fleming was awarded the 2020 Protein Society Carl Brändén Award.

Early life and education 
Fleming grew up in a family of doctors and nurses, and decided to study medicine at university. She eventually studied French and pre-medical studies at the University of Notre Dame. She realised that she did not like blood, so moved into scientific research instead. After graduating Fleming attended the Catholic University of the West, where she studied French language and culture, before moving to Washington, D.C. to work at the Embassy of Morocco. Fleming missed scientific research, and decided to work toward a doctorate at Georgetown University. Her PhD focussed on molecular biology and during her research she became increasingly interested in proteins. Fleming was a postdoctoral researcher at Yale University, where she worked with Donald Engelman in the Department of Molecular Biophysics. Here she investigated the interaction of transmembrane alpha helices.

Research and career 
In 2000 Fleming started her research laboratory at Johns Hopkins University. She continued to study the interactions of transmembrane helices, as well as investigating beta barrels. Her work on beta barrels allowed her research group to significantly increase the number of known membrane protein stabilities. She created a hydrophobicity scale to describe protein side-chains. Fleming performed some of the first measurements of the thermodynamics of protein folding. She developed a theoretical framework to describe the association of helices. In 2010 Fleming served as president of the Gibbs Society of Biological Thermodynamics. Fleming uses her understanding of protein interactions to monitor the maturation of human microorganisms.

Academic service 
Alongside her academic research, Fleming runs workshops on diversity and bias. During the workshops she discusses social science literature on gender bias and discrimination. The workshops evolved into workshops that cover confidence, the power of bystanders and positive actions that people can take to improve the research community. She maintains the blog Inclusive Excellence' which discusses initiatives to empower women scientists. Fleming was a founder of the Women of Hopkins exhibition, which profiled women members of faculty at Johns Hopkins University. She serves as Co-Chair of the Homewood Campus of Johns Hopkins University Women Faculty Forum.

Awards and honours 
Her awards and honours include:

 2015 Diversity Leadership Council Award
 2015 Chair of the Gordon Research Conference on Membrane Folding
 2016 Biophysical Society Thomas E. Thompson Award
 2019 Johns Hopkins University Provost's Prize for Faculty Excellence in Diversity
 2020 Protein Society Carl Brändén Award

Selected publications 
 
 
 

Fleming is an Associate Editor of the Journal of Biological Chemistry.

References

Living people
Year of birth missing (living people)
University of Notre Dame alumni
Yale University fellows
Georgetown University alumni
Johns Hopkins University faculty
Women biophysicists